Irvine in Ayrshire was a royal burgh that returned one commissioner to the Parliament of Scotland and to the Convention of Estates.

After the Acts of Union 1707, Irvine, Ayr, Campbeltown, Inveraray and Rothesay formed the Ayr district of burghs, returning one member between them to the House of Commons of Great Britain.

List of burgh commissioners

 1579–87: Hugh Campbell
 1648: Robert Brown 
 1649–51: Robert Barclay 
 1661: Alan Dunlop the younger of Craig, provost
 1665 convention, 1667 convention, 1669: Robert Cunningham, provost (died c.1670) 
 1673–74: Arthur Hamilton, town clerk 
 1678 convention: John Montgomerie the younger of Bench, merchant-burgess 
 1685–86: George Leslie, baillie 
 1689 convention, 1689–1702: Alexander Cuninghame of Chirrislands 
 1702–05: Alexander Cunynghame of Collellan (died c.1705)
 1705–07: George Monro, baillie

See also
 List of constituencies in the Parliament of Scotland at the time of the Union

References

Constituencies of the Parliament of Scotland (to 1707)
Constituencies disestablished in 1707
1707 disestablishments in Scotland
Irvine, North Ayrshire
Politics of North Ayrshire